Ben Hallock (born November 22, 1997) is an American water polo player. He was a member of the United States men's national water polo team at the 2016 Summer Olympics.

References

External links
 

1997 births
Living people
American male water polo players
Olympic water polo players of the United States
Water polo players at the 2016 Summer Olympics
Harvard-Westlake School alumni
Pan American Games medalists in water polo
Pan American Games gold medalists for the United States
Water polo players at the 2019 Pan American Games
Medalists at the 2019 Pan American Games
Water polo players at the 2020 Summer Olympics